Gary Sullivan (born June 24, 1982 in West Islip, New York) is an American soccer defender who plays  for the Long Island Rough Riders.  He spent one season with the Colorado Rapids in Major League Soccer.

Youth
Sullivan attended West Islip High School where he was a four year varsity letterman.  He then played college soccer for Adelphi University from 2000 to 2003.  As a sophomore, he was named team MVP, and he was named first-team all-ASC as a junior.  He was again a first-team all-ASC selection in 2003, and was a nominee for the Hermann Trophy, Which is the award to the best college player in the country.

Professional
In 2001, he played for the New York Freedom of the Premier Development League.  In 2003, he played for the Brooklyn Knights.  In February 2004, Sullivan was selected 45th overall in the 2004 MLS SuperDraft by the Colorado Rapids.  Although he played in 16 games, Sullivan was used mostly as a substitute, at defender and occasionally forward, and only played 339 minutes in 2004. He left the team in 2005 to return to college and play with the Rough Riders in the USL Second Division.  He was first team All League in 2005.  In 2006, he was selected as the USL-2 Defender of the Year.

After Retirement 
He is now a physical education teacher at Veritas Academy in Flushing, New York. As well as a coach for East Meadow Soccer Club.

References

External links
 College player profile

1982 births
Living people
Adelphi Panthers men's soccer players
American soccer players
Brooklyn Knights players
Colorado Rapids players
Long Island Rough Riders players
Major League Soccer players
New York Freedom players
USL Second Division players
USL League Two players
Soccer players from New York (state)
Colorado Rapids draft picks
People from West Islip, New York
Association football defenders